SmartGate (eGate in New Zealand) is an automated self-service border control system operated by the Australian Border Force and New Zealand Customs Service and located at immigration checkpoints in departure and arrival halls in ten Australian international airports, and 4 New Zealand international airports (as eGate). SmartGates allow Australian ePassport holders and ePassport holders of a number of other countries to clear immigration controls more rapidly, and to enhance travel security by performing passport control checks electronically. SmartGate uses facial recognition technology to verify the traveller's identity against the data stored in the chip in their biometric passport, as well as checking against immigration databases. To use the SmartGate system, the traveller must have a biometric passport from Australia, New Zealand or certain other countries (these ePassports have the biometric logo on the front cover). The ePassport gate scanner reads all the information contained in the chip inside the passport and runs the data against numerous databases to determine if the traveller is a security risk, while a camera takes a picture of the traveller and an officer at a control station behind the gates checks that the image captured by the camera matches the one on the passport (facial recognition). Once the data verification and facial recognition process is complete, doors will automatically either open, signifying that the traveller is permitted to enter and/or exit the country, or remain closed and a stop icon illuminate, demonstrating that the traveller has failed the security checks and will personally meet with immigration officials.

Travellers require a biometric passport to use SmartGate as it uses information from the passport (such as photograph, name and date of birth) and in the respective countries' databases (i.e. banned travellers database) to decide whether to grant entry or departure from the country or to generate a referral to a customs agent. These checks would otherwise require manual processing by a human which is time-consuming, costly and potentially error-prone.

History 
The first trials of SmartGate began in 2002 with Qantas aircrews. The trials were expanded in 2004 to include over 1,000 Qantas platinum frequent flyers, and in 2007 it was launched to the public at Brisbane Airport.

Since October 2005, Australia has issued only biometric passports, called ePassports. As the validity of Australian passports do not exceed 10 years, all previous Australian passports have now expired and all valid passports are now biometric.

In May 2015, the Australian Government announced that SmartGate will be launched at air and sea ports, using solely biometrics to identify and process arriving passengers, with a goal of processing 90% of air travellers automatically by 2020. The introduction of biometric arrivals, under the Seamless Traveller initiative, is expected to cost approximately AU$93.7m over 5 years and be completed by March 2019.

Eligibility

Australia 
Travellers are required to hold an ePassport, a valid Australian visa (except for Australian and New Zealand citizens) and complete an arrival card. The system requires travellers to look as much like their passport photo as possible, which may require removing glasses or hats when using SmartGate.

Exceptions 
There are a number of notable exceptions when entering and departing Australia and using SmartGate.

 If airline crew meet the above requirements they are also eligible to use SmartGate or they may continue to use the "crew lane".
 Australian and New Zealand citizens travelling on military orders may not use SmartGate upon arrival.
 Australian children aged 10 to 15 years (inclusive) can use SmartGate upon arrival if they are accompanied by at least two adults.

Locations 
In Australia, SmartGate is available at ten international airports:

New Zealand 
eGate uses biometrics to match the picture of your face in your ePassport with the picture it takes of you at the gate. To make sure eGate is able to do this, passengers must look as similar to their ePassport photo as possible. Passengers should avoid headwear (including veils, scarfs, and hats) that obscure the face.

Requirements 
Departing travellers, regardless of age and nationality, can use SmartGate if they have a machine-readable passport and can independently use the machine.

Arriving travellers using eGate must:

 be over the age of 12 
 hold an ePassport issued by one of the following countries:

In New Zealand, SmartGate (named eGate) is available at four international airports:

Privacy issues 
The SmartGate system collects personal information includes the information on the biometric page of the passport, such as name, gender, date of birth, passport number, passport photograph, nationality, and the country of origin of the passport.

Other information may also be collected, such as travel details, and the facial biometric template.

Travellers passports are no longer stamped if they are processed by SmartGate.

See also
 ePassport gates - a similar system operated in the United Kingdom
 Parafe - a similar system operated in France

References

External links
 Australian Border Force: SmartGates

Borders of Australia
Biometrics
Expedited border crossing schemes